Kasky is the surname of the following people:
Cameron Kasky (born 2000), is an American activist and advocate against gun violence 
Marc Kasky (born 1944), American consumer activist

See also
Kaski (disambiguation)
Käsky (Tears of April), a 2008 Finnish war drama film